Elections to Clackmannanshire Council were held on 3 May 2007, the same day as the other Scottish local government elections and the Scottish Parliament general election. The election was the first one using 5 new wards created as a result of the Local Governance (Scotland) Act 2004, each ward will elect three or four councillors using the single transferable vote system form of proportional representation. The new wards replace 18 single-member wards which used the plurality (first past the post) system of election.

Election results
The votes and percentage of vote share are based on first preference votes.

Ward results

Changes since 2007 Election
†On 15 December 2011, Clackmannanshire West Cllr Eddie Carrick resigned from the Labour Party and is now an Independent.
††On 14 March 2012, Clackmannanshire South Cllr Craig Holden joined the Scottish National Party and ceased to be an Independent.

References

External links

2007 Scottish local elections
21st century in Clackmannanshire
2007